This is a list of 127 species in Yelicones, a genus of braconid wasps in the family Braconidae.

Yelicones species

 Yelicones affinis Quicke, Austin & Chishti, 1998 c g
 Yelicones africanus Quicke & Chishti, 1997 c g
 Yelicones anchanae Areekul & Quicke, 2006 c g
 Yelicones anitae Areekul & Quicke, 2006 c g
 Yelicones arizonus Quicke, Chishti & Basibuyuk, 1996 c g
 Yelicones artitus Areekul & Quicke, 2006 c g
 Yelicones ateronotus Areekul & Quicke, 2006 c g
 Yelicones barroci Quicke, Chishti & Basibuyuk, 1996 c g
 Yelicones bello Areekul & Quicke, 2006 c g
 Yelicones belokobylskiji Quicke, Chishti & Chen, 1997 c g
 Yelicones belshawi Areekul & Quicke, 2006 c g
 Yelicones bentoni Areekul & Quicke, 2006 c g
 Yelicones bicoloripes Quicke, Chishti & Basibuyuk, 1996 c g
 Yelicones boliviensis Areekul & Quicke, 2006 c g
 Yelicones braziliensis Areekul & Quicke, 2006 c g
 Yelicones buloloensis Quicke, Austin & Chishti, 1998 c g
 Yelicones butcheri Areekul & Quicke, 2006 c g
 Yelicones cameroni Szepligeti, 1902 c g
 Yelicones canalensis Quicke, Chishti & Basibuyuk, 1996 c g
 Yelicones cardaleae Quicke, Austin & Chishti, 1998 c g
 Yelicones colombiensis Areekul & Quicke, 2006 c g
 Yelicones concavus Areekul & Quicke, 2006 c g
 Yelicones confusus Quicke, Chishti & Basibuyuk, 1996 c g
 Yelicones contractus Papp, 1991 c g
 Yelicones cooki Areekul & Quicke, 2006 c g
 Yelicones crassicornis Cameron, 1887 c g
 Yelicones crassipes Szepligeti, 1904 c g
 Yelicones crassitarsis (Cameron, 1911) c g
 Yelicones crica Quicke, Chishti & Basibuyuk, 1996 c g
 Yelicones crurobicolor Areekul & Quicke, 2006 c g
 Yelicones delicatus (Cresson, 1872) c g b
 Yelicones desertus Quicke, Austin & Chishti, 1998 c g
 Yelicones diasus Areekul & Quicke, 2006 c g
 Yelicones divaricatus Papp, 1992 c g
 Yelicones doyeni Quicke, Austin & Chishti, 1998 c g
 Yelicones elegans Papp, 1992 c g
 Yelicones fijiensis Quicke, Austin & Chishti, 1998 c g
 Yelicones fisheri Areekul & Quicke, 2004 c g
 Yelicones fittoni Quicke, Austin & Chishti, 1998 c g
 Yelicones flavus Chen & Quicke, 1997 c g
 Yelicones gavinbroadi Areekul & Quicke, 2006 c g
 Yelicones geminus Areekul & Quicke, 2006 c g
 Yelicones gessi Quicke & Chishti, 1997 c g
 Yelicones girardozae Areekul & Quicke, 2006 c g
 Yelicones glabromaculatus Belokobylskij, 1993 c g
 Yelicones gracilus Areekul & Quicke, 2006 c g
 Yelicones hansoni Areekul & Quicke, 2006 c g
 Yelicones howdeni Quicke, Chishti & Basibuyuk, 1996 c g
 Yelicones huggerti Areekul & Quicke, 2006 c g
 Yelicones infuriatus Quicke, Chishti & Basibuyuk, 1996 c g
 Yelicones iranus (Fischer, 1963) c g
 Yelicones joaquimi Areekul & Quicke, 2006 c g
 Yelicones kibaleiensis Areekul & Quicke, 2004 c g
 Yelicones koreanus Papp, 1985 c g
 Yelicones kraaijeveldi Areekul & Quicke, 2006 c g
 Yelicones levelus Areekul & Quicke, 2006 c g
 Yelicones longiantennatus Areekul & Quicke, 2006 c g
 Yelicones longigena Areekul & Quicke, 2006 c g
 Yelicones longivena Quicke, Chishti & Chen, 1997 c g
 Yelicones longulus Quicke, Chishti & Basibuyuk, 1996 c g
 Yelicones luridus Papp, 1991 c g
 Yelicones luteus Quicke, Chishti & Basibuyuk, 1996 c g
 Yelicones maculatus Papp, 1985 c g
 Yelicones magnus Areekul & Quicke, 2006 c g
 Yelicones manzarii Areekul & Quicke, 2006 c g
 Yelicones marutus Areekul & Quicke, 2006 c g
 Yelicones mayi Areekul & Quicke, 2006 c g
 Yelicones medius Areekul & Quicke, 2006 c g
 Yelicones melanocephalus Cameron, 1887 c g
 Yelicones minutus Quicke & Chishti, 1997 c g
 Yelicones napo Areekul & Quicke, 2006 c g
 Yelicones natsanae Areekul & Quicke, 2006 c g
 Yelicones naumanni Quicke, Austin & Chishti, 1998 c g
 Yelicones nigridorsum Quicke, Austin & Chishti, 1998 c g
 Yelicones nigrigaster Quicke, Chishti & Basibuyuk, 1996 c g
 Yelicones nigroantennatus Areekul & Quicke, 2006 c g
 Yelicones nigrocaputus Areekul & Quicke, 2006 c g
 Yelicones nigromaculatus Quicke & Chishti, 1997 c g
 Yelicones nigromarginatus Quicke & Kruft, 1995 c g b
 Yelicones nipponensis Togashi, 1980 c g
 Yelicones ormei Areekul & Quicke, 2006 c g
 Yelicones panameus Quicke, Chishti & Basibuyuk, 1996 c g
 Yelicones pappi Quicke & Chishti, 1997 c g
 Yelicones paradoxus (Fischer, 1961) c g
 Yelicones paso Areekul & Quicke, 2006 c g
 Yelicones pennapallidus Areekul & Quicke, 2006 c g
 Yelicones pennapunctum Areekul & Quicke, 2006 c g
 Yelicones pennatrum Areekul & Quicke, 2006 c g
 Yelicones pennoexemplarus Areekul & Quicke, 2006 c g
 Yelicones peruensis Areekul & Quicke, 2006 c g
 Yelicones pilops Quicke & Kruft, 1995 c g
 Yelicones plaumanni Areekul & Quicke, 2006 c g
 Yelicones plenus Areekul & Quicke, 2006 c g
 Yelicones pocsi Papp, 1991 c g
 Yelicones polaszeki Areekul & Quicke, 2006 c g
 Yelicones publicus Areekul & Quicke, 2006 c g
 Yelicones pulawskii Areekul & Quicke, 2006 c g
 Yelicones pulcherus Areekul & Quicke, 2006 c g
 Yelicones quarterus Areekul & Quicke, 2006 c g
 Yelicones ramosi Areekul & Quicke, 2006 c g
 Yelicones samaesanensis  g
 Yelicones sangvornae Areekul & Quicke, 2006 c g
 Yelicones satoshii Areekul & Quicke, 2006 c g
 Yelicones scutellaris Quicke, Austin & Chishti, 1998 c g
 Yelicones setosus Quicke, Chishti & Basibuyuk, 1996 c g
 Yelicones shawi Quicke, Austin & Chishti, 1998 c g
 Yelicones siamensis Areekul & Quicke, 2002 c g
 Yelicones spectabilis Areekul & Quicke, 2004 c g
 Yelicones spurcus Areekul & Quicke, 2006 c g
 Yelicones sumatranus (Fischer, 1962) c
 Yelicones surinamensis Areekul & Quicke, 2006 c g
 Yelicones tavaresi Areekul & Quicke, 2006 c g
 Yelicones theinsrii Areekul & Quicke, 2006 c g
 Yelicones tricolor Quicke, Chishti & Basibuyuk, 1996 c g
 Yelicones usae Areekul & Quicke, 2006 c g
 Yelicones usanae Areekul & Quicke, 2006 c g
 Yelicones variegatus Areekul & Quicke, 2004 c g
 Yelicones vespapulcher Areekul & Quicke, 2006 c g
 Yelicones vestigium Areekul & Quicke, 2006 c g
 Yelicones vilawanae Areekul & Quicke, 2006 c g
 Yelicones violaceipennis Cameron, 1887 c g
 Yelicones vojnitsi Papp, 1992 c g
 Yelicones vulgaris Quicke, Austin & Chishti, 1998 c g
 Yelicones woldai Quicke, Chishti & Basibuyuk, 1996 c g
 Yelicones wui Chen & He, 1995 c g
 Yelicones zaldivari Areekul & Quicke, 2006 c g
 Yelicones zitanae Areekul & Quicke, 2006 c g

Data sources: i = ITIS, c = Catalogue of Life, g = GBIF, b = Bugguide.net

References

Yelicones